Frank Townsend (17 October 1847 – 25 October 1920) was an English amateur cricketer who played first-class cricket from 1870 to 1891 for Gloucestershire County Cricket Club.  Townsend represented the Gentlemen on a number of occasions between 1874 and 1885.  He was a right-handed batsman and an underarm right arm slow bowler who made 179 career appearances. Townsend scored 5,110 runs including two centuries with a highest score of 136.  He held 131 catches and took 101 wickets with a best bowling analysis of 6/31.

His son Frank Norton Townsend (born on 16 September 1875) was also a Gloucestershire cricketer.

References

1847 births
1920 deaths
English cricketers
English cricketers of 1864 to 1889
Gloucestershire cricketers
Gentlemen cricketers
Gentlemen of England cricketers
North v South cricketers
Over 30s v Under 30s cricketers